Nadine Njeim may refer to:

 Nadine Nassib Njeim (born 1984), Lebanese actress and former Miss Lebanon 2004
 Nadine Wilson Njeim (born 1988), Lebanese actress and former Miss Lebanon 2007